Lewis Township is one of eleven townships in Clay County, Indiana. As of the 2010 census, its population was 1,464 and it contained 632 housing units.

History
Lewis Township was organized in the 1840s. It was named for Lewis Cass.

Geography

Unincorporated towns
 Bogle Corner
 Brunswick
 Buchanan Corner
 Coalmont
 Howesville
(This list is based on USGS data and may include former settlements.)

Adjacent townships
 Perry Township (north)
 Harrison Township (northeast)
 Smith Township, Greene County (southeast)
 Wright Township, Greene County (south)
 Jackson Township, Sullivan County (west)
 Pierson Township, Vigo County (northwest)

Major highways
  Indiana State Road 48
  Indiana State Road 59
  Indiana State Road 159
  Indiana State Road 246

Cemeteries
The township contains three cemeteries: Oak Grove, Old Union and Sanders.

References
 
 United States Census Bureau cartographic boundary files

External links
 Indiana Township Association
 United Township Association of Indiana

Townships in Clay County, Indiana
Terre Haute metropolitan area
Townships in Indiana